The Tula electoral district was a constituency created for the 1917 Russian Constituent Assembly election. The electoral district covered the Tula Governorate. The city of Tula was a major metallurgical industrial centre, located close to Moscow.

The account of U.S. historian Oliver Henry Radkey, who is the source for the results table below, has a complete vote count from the city of Tula and 10 out 12 uezds are complete. The votes from Yefremov uezd and one of the volosts of Odoyev uezd are not covered in Radkey's account.

Results

References

Electoral districts of the Russian Constituent Assembly election, 1917